Monkeemania (40 Timeless Hits) is a Monkees compilation released in Australia in 1979. It contains 40 of the Monkees' songs, including hit singles, B-sides, album tracks and three previously unreleased tracks: "Love to Love," "Steam Engine" and a live version of "Circle Sky."

Due to the unavailability of the Monkees' master tapes in Australia at this time, "needledrop" vinyl recordings of songs had to be used, resulting in various sound quality issues.

The photo of the band used on the cover is a reversed image from the original.

Track listing

LP 1
"(Theme from) The Monkees" (Tommy Boyce, Bobby Hart) – 2:17
"Last Train to Clarksville" (Boyce, Hart) – 2:48
"(I'm Not Your) Steppin' Stone" (Boyce, Hart) – 2:21
"I'm a Believer" (Neil Diamond) – 2:42
"A Little Bit Me, a Little Bit You" (Diamond) – 2:49
"Look Out (Here Comes Tomorrow)" (Diamond) – 2:12
"She" (Boyce, Hart) – 2:37
"Words" (Boyce, Hart) – 2:46
"Saturday's Child" (David Gates) - 2:40
"Cuddly Toy" (Harry Nilsson) - 2:35
"Take a Giant Step" (Gerry Goffin, Carole King) - 2:30
"Sometime in the Morning" (Goffin, King) - 2:27
"Pleasant Valley Sunday" (Goffin, King) - 3:12
"Star Collector" (Goffin, King) - 3:30
"Sweet Young Thing" (Goffin, King, Michael Nesmith) - 1:54
"Porpoise Song" (Theme from Head) (Goffin, King) - 4:00
"As We Go Along" (King, Toni Stern) - 3:53
"Shades of Gray" (Barry Mann, Cynthia Weil) - 3:20
"Love Is Only Sleeping" (Mann, Weil) - 2:23
"The Girl I Left Behind Me" (Neil Sedaka, Carole Bayer Sager) - 2:42

LP 2
"Mary, Mary" (Nesmith) - 2:10
"Randy Scouse Git (Alternate Title)" (Micky Dolenz) – 2:32
"The Girl I Knew Somewhere" (Nesmith) – 2:32
"You and I" (Bill Chadwick, Davy Jones) - 2:10
"Tapioca Tundra" (Nesmith) - 3:06
"Mommy and Daddy" (Dolenz) - 2:10
"For Pete's Sake" (Joey Richards, Peter Tork) - 2:10
"Good Clean Fun" (Nesmith) - 2:15
"Listen to the Band" (Nesmith) - 2:45
"Circle Sky" (live) (Nesmith) - 2:32
"Daydream Believer" (John Stewart) – 2:55
"What Am I Doing Hanging 'Round" (Michael Martin Murphey, Owen Castleman) – 3:02
"D.W. Washburn" (Leiber & Stoller) - 2:43
"Valleri" (Boyce, Hart) - 2:15
"Looking for the Good Times" (Boyce, Hart) - 2:00
"Someday Man" (Roger Nichols, Paul Williams) – 2:38
"Oh, My, My" (Jeff Barry, Andy Kim) - 2:56
"Steam Engine" (Chip Douglas) - 2:21
"Love to Love" (Diamond) - 2:35
"Goin' Down" (Dolenz, Diane Hildebrand, Jones, Nesmith, Tork) - 3:57
"Tema Dei Monkees" (Boyce, Hart, Nistri) - 2:16

References

1979 greatest hits albums
The Monkees compilation albums
Arista Records compilation albums